McCullen is a surname. Notable people with the surname include:

Aidan McCullen (born 1977), Irish businessman and rugby union player
Dave McCullen (born 1977), Belgian record producer and musician
Joseph T. McCullen Jr. (born 1935), American venture capitalist
Sonja McCullen, American judge